This is a List of Allied convoys during World War II by region.

European Coastal Atlantic convoys

North Atlantic convoys

North American coastal and Caribbean convoys

Mediterranean and North African coastal convoys

South Atlantic convoys

Indian Ocean convoys

Pacific convoys

Normandy invasion convoys

References

 

01
Allied convoy by region
.
.
.
.
.
.
.
Battle of the Atlantic
Allied convoys during World War II